Namdar may refer to:

People 
Namdar (surname)
Namdar, Kermanshah
Namdar, Lorestan
Namdar-e Bala

Companies 
 Namdar Realty Group, a shopping mall investment company in the United States